The Chakrabarti Inquiry was a 2016 investigation into allegations of antisemitism and other forms of racism in the United Kingdom's Labour Party. Chaired by barrister Shami Chakrabarti, the inquiry was launched following comments made by two high-profile Labour figures, Naz Shah and Ken Livingstone, that some asserted were antisemitic in nature; Shah, a Member of Parliament, and Livingstone, the former mayor of London, were subsequently suspended from the party pending an investigation. The inquiry presented its findings on 30 June 2016, stating that although antisemitism and other types of racism were not endemic within Labour, there was an "occasionally toxic atmosphere".

Background
The inquiry was established by Labour Party leader Jeremy Corbyn on 29 April 2016, following the suspension of Naz Shah, the Labour MP for Bradford West, and Ken Livingstone, the former mayor of London, after media reports had emerged that Shah had reposted a graphic on Twitter during 2014 suggesting that Israel should be relocated to the United States, after which Livingstone defended her during a radio interview, adding that "When Hitler won his election in 1932 his policy then was that Jews should be moved to Israel. He was supporting Zionism before he went mad and ended up killing six million Jews." Both were subsequently suspended from the party pending an investigation into their conduct.

Announcing the inquiry, Corbyn told The Guardian newspaper that he was determined to expunge racism from the party: "Labour is an anti-racist party to its core and has a long and proud history of standing against racism, including antisemitism." He appointed Shami Chakrabarti, the former head of the human rights advocacy group Liberty, to chair the investigation. The inquiry's remit would be to recommend how Labour could best tackle instances of racism, including cases of antisemitism and Islamophobia, with Chakrabarti speaking to various groups affected by such issues, such as the Jewish community. She would then report back to party officials within two months, and set out guidelines on acceptable behaviour and language.

On 16 May 2016, Chakrabarti announced that she had joined the Labour Party in order to gain members' trust and confidence, but expressed confidence that this would not compromise her independence. The inquiry had two deputy chairs: Jan Royall, who was at the time holding an investigation into antisemitism at Oxford University Labour Club, and director of the Pears Institute for the Study of Antisemitism David Feldman.

The controversy occurred at a critical time for Labour, as the party prepared to contest the May 2016 local elections, and amid mounting concerns from some Labour figures about Corbyn's leadership.

Findings and recommendations
The inquiry's findings were published at a Labour Party event on 30 June. Chakrabarti's report made twenty recommendations on tackling instances of racism, including the following:
Abusive references to any particular person or group based on actual or perceived physical characteristics and racial or religious tropes and stereotypes, should have no place in Labour Party discourse.  These epithets includes terms such as "Zio" and "Paki."
Labour members should resist the use of Hitler, Nazi and Holocaust metaphors, distortions and comparisons in debates about Israel-Palestine in particular.
There should be procedural rule changes to improve the party's disciplinary process and the adoption and publication of a complaints procedure.
The appointment of a general counsel to the Labour Party to give advice on issues including disciplinary matters and to take responsibility for instructing external lawyers.
The party should increase the ethnic diversity of its staff.
The report rejects the idea of a lifetime membership ban from the party for anyone deemed to have used racist language, and suggests no retrospective action i.e. against comments made prior to the inquiry.
The report concluded that the party "is not overrun by anti-Semitism, Islamophobia, or other forms of racism," but has suffered from an "occasionally toxic atmosphere" and "too much clear evidence [of] ignorant attitudes".

Responding to the report, Chief Rabbi Ephraim Mirvis urged a "full and unhesitating implementation of [its] findings". Writing for The Guardian, the academic Keith Kahn-Harris suggested Chakrabarti had "delivered a report that, while not the last word on the subject, does at least deserve to be discussed seriously and calmly". Professor David Feldman, the director of the Pears Institute for the study of Antisemitism, stated "This is an important document at a time, when more than ever, we need to stand firm against all forms of racism and intolerance. The report marks a positive step towards ensuring that the Labour Party is a welcoming place for all minority groups. It recommends steps to ensure that members act in a spirit of tolerance and respect, while maintaining principles of free speech and open debate. The recommendations are constructive and provide a sound basis on which the Party can move forward."

Launch

Marc Wadsworth comments
However, the report's launch was quickly overshadowed when Labour MP Ruth Smeeth, who is Jewish, was accused by audience member Marc Wadsworth, an activist from the pro-Corbyn Momentum Black ConneXions, of working "hand-in-hand" with The Daily Telegraph (whose reporter, Kate McCann was present at the time), when he saw them talking together and exchanging his press release, and with right-wing media in general.

Smeeth criticised Corbyn for not speaking out in her defence following the allegation levelled against her by Wadsworth: "It is beyond belief that someone could come to the launch of a report on antisemitism in the Labour Party and espouse such vile conspiracy theories about Jewish people, which were ironically highlighted as such in Ms Chakrabarti's report, while the leader of my own party stood by and did absolutely nothing...a Labour Party under his stewardship cannot be a safe space for British Jews." Smeeth also said that she had written to the general secretary of the Labour Party and chair of the Parliamentary Labour Party to make a formal complaint about the incident. Chakrabarti subsequently said that she had admonished Wadsworth for his remarks, an action with which she said Corbyn had "concurred"; she also apologised to Smeeth. Wadsworth said he was unaware that Smeeth is Jewish. Wadsworth was subsequently expelled by the party for this behaviour.

Corbyn comments
Speaking at the launch of the inquiry findings, Corbyn said that he would put his weight behind an "immediate implementation" of the report's recommendations. He faced criticism when he was accused of comparing Israel's actions to those of ISIS. He made his comments as he was discussing the report's contents, telling activists that "our Jewish friends are no more responsible for the actions of Israel or the Netanyahu government than our Muslim friends are for those various self-styled Islamic states or organisations." Mirvis described the remarks as "offensive", and said that "rather than rebuilding trust among the Jewish community, are likely to cause even greater concern". A spokesman for Corbyn sought later to clarify the remarks, saying that Corbyn "was explicitly stating that people should not be held responsible for the actions of states or organisations around the world on the basis of religion or ethnicity." Chakrabarti also defended Corbyn, telling LBC radio that she had read Corbyn's speech just before the event: "I read the leader's speech five minutes before we went into the main room. ... I listened very carefully to what he said. He reflected my report. ... His point was: when you have Jewish neighbours or friends, or Muslim neighbours or friends and something bad happens in the world, don't ask them to be the first to explain or defend or condemn."

Peerage and shadow cabinet role
Jeremy Corbyn announced Chakrabarti as the only Labour appointment to the House of Lords in July 2016. In October 2016, she was appointed to the Shadow Cabinet of Jeremy Corbyn as Shadow Attorney General for England and Wales. Following her appointment, Labour MPs Tom Watson and Wes Streeting and some Jewish groups questioned the credibility of the inquiry's findings. A spokesman for Corbyn said that Chakrabarti was "an ideal appointment to the Lords".

A cross-party Home Affairs Select Committee inquiry into antisemitism in the UK later that year invited Corbyn, Chakrabati and Livingstone, amongst others, to give evidence in a separate, wider investigation of anti-semitism. The Select Committee's report described the Chakrabati Inquiry as "ultimately compromised" by Chakrabarti's later acceptance of a peerage and position in the Shadow Cabinet. The Committee said that Chakrabati had been "insufficiently open" in her answers to them over when she was offered her peerage. Corbyn said that the criticism of Chakrabati's independence was unfair, saying he had appointed her after the completion of the report, based on her legal and campaigning experience and accused the Select Committee of "political framing" and undue emphasis on the Labour party.

References

External links

2016 in British politics
History of the Labour Party (UK)
Antisemitism in the United Kingdom
Left-wing antisemitism
Jeremy Corbyn